The men's basketball tournament at the 1963 Pan American Games was held from April 23 to May 3, 1963 in São Paulo, Brazil.

Men's competition

Participating nations

Final ranking

Medalists

Awards

Women's competition

Participating nations

Final ranking

Awards

References
 Results
 basketpedya

1955
basketball
Pan American Games
1963 Pan American Games
1963 Pan American Games